The 2007 Primera División del Fútbol Profesional Chileno season is the 76th season of top-flight football in Chile. The season is composed of two championship: the Torneo Apertura & Torneo Clasura.

Format
Each tournament had a different format. The Apertura had a double round-robin format. The team with the most points at the end will be the champion. The Clausura consisted of two stages. The first stage was a double round-robin format. The two best teams from each group advanced to the playoffs. The playoffs were in a single-elimination format, the winner of which was the champion.

Torneo Apertura

Standings

Top goalscorers

Copa Sudamericana playoffs

Torneo Clausura

First stage

Playoff match

Playoff stage

Top goalscorers

Relegation

Relegation playoffs

See also
List of 2007 Primera División de Chile transfers

References

External links
Official website of the ANFP

  
Primera División de Chile seasons
Chile
1